The 2012 VIVA World Cup was the fifth and final VIVA World Cup, an international tournament for football open to non-FIFA-affiliated teams, played in the Iraqi Kurdistan. It marked a new record in the competition's history, with nine teams competing for the Nelson Mandela Trophy, from 4 to 9 June. Al Iraqiya signed a television rights agreement with the NF-Board and the Kurdistan Football Association to broadcast all the matches.

Participating teams

Venues

Squads

Group stage

Group A

Group B

Group C

Knockout stage

9th Place Match

5th–8th Place Semi-finals

7th Place Match

5th Place Match

Semi-finals

3rd Place Match

Final

References

External links
NF Board Official Site
Twitter Updates

2012
2012 in association football
International association football competitions hosted by Iraq
Football in Kurdistan